Cerobasis insularis is a species of Psocoptera from the Trogiidae family that is endemic to the Canary Islands.

References

Trogiidae
Insects described in 1996
Endemic fauna of the Canary Islands
Insects of the Canary Islands